Jane Harris may refer to:

 Jane Harris (producer), British television director and producer
 Jane Harris (writer) (born 1961), British writer of fiction and screenplays
 Jane Harris (Neighbours), a fictional character in the Australian soap opera Neighbours
 Jane Elizabeth Harris (c. 1853–1942), New Zealand writer, lecturer and spiritualist